Robert J. O'Conor Jr. (born June 22, 1934) is a former United States district judge of the United States District Court for the Southern District of Texas and is currently an attorney in private practice.

Education and career

O'Conor was born in Los Angeles, California. He received a Bachelor of Arts degree from the University of Texas at Austin in 1956. He received a Bachelor of Laws from the University of Texas School of Law in 1957. He was in the United States Army Reserve as a Captain in the JAG Corps from 1957 to 1964. He was in private practice of law in Laredo, Texas from 1958 to 1975.

Federal judicial service

O'Conor was nominated by President Gerald Ford on March 17, 1975, to a seat on the United States District Court for the Southern District of Texas vacated by Judge Ben Clarkson Connally. He was confirmed by the United States Senate on April 24, 1975, and received his commission on April 25, 1975. O'Conor's service was terminated on September 30, 1984, due to his resignation.

Post judicial service

After his resignation from the federal bench, O'Conor returned to the private practice of law in Houston, Texas. As of June 2018, he remains active with law firm FedArb, which provides alternative dispute resolution in complex commercial cases. In addition to his service with FedArb, he also maintains a private law practice with his wife, Helen D. O'Conor.

References

Sources
 

1934 births
Living people
Judges of the United States District Court for the Southern District of Texas
United States district court judges appointed by Gerald Ford
20th-century American judges
United States Army officers
University of Texas School of Law alumni
People from Los Angeles